This is a list of properties and districts in Bacon County, Georgia that are listed on the National Register of Historic Places (NRHP).

Current listings

|}

References

Bacon
Bacon County, Georgia
National Register of Historic Places in Bacon County, Georgia